Fraxinus insularis, the Chinese flowering ash or island ash, is a species of flowering plant in the family Oleaceae, native to central and southeastern China, Hainan, Taiwan, the Ryukyu Islands, and Yakushima, Japan. Its leaves produce a number of secoiridoid glucosides.

References

insularis
Flora of North-Central China
Flora of South-Central China
Flora of Southeast China
Flora of Hainan
Flora of Taiwan
Flora of the Ryukyu Islands
Flora of Japan
Plants described in 1889